Epsilon Centauri (ε Cen, ε Centauri) is a star in the southern constellation of Centaurus. It is one of the brightest stars in the constellation with a slightly variable apparent visual magnitude of +2.30.

ε Centauri is a massive star with nearly 12 times the mass of the Sun. The spectrum matches a stellar classification of B1 III, indicating this is an evolved giant star. It is radiating more than 15,000 times the luminosity of the Sun from its outer atmosphere at an effective temperature of 24,000 K, giving it the blue-white hue of a B-type star. This is classified as a Beta Cephei type variable star with a primary period of 0.16961 days (4 hours 4 minutes), completing 5.9 cycles per day. During each cycle, the brightness of the star varies from apparent magnitude +2.29 to +2.31.

This star is a proper motion member of the Lower Centaurus–Crux sub-group in the Scorpius–Centaurus OB association, the nearest such association of co-moving massive stars to the Sun. Epsilon Centauri is a relatively young star, with an age of around 16 million years.

References

Centaurus (constellation)
Centauri, Epsilon
Beta Cephei variables
B-type giants
Lower Centaurus Crux
Nán Mén yī
5132
118716
066657
CD-52 06655